Milotice is a municipality and village in Hodonín District in the South Moravian Region of the Czech Republic. It has about 1,900 inhabitants.

Geography
It lies in a flat landscape of the Lower Morava Valley. In the eastern part of the municipality is located the Písečný pond, protected as a nature reserve.

History
The first written mention of Milotice is from 1341. A fortress in Milotice was first mentioned in 1360. During the Hussite Wars in 1427, the Hussites founded a fortified military camp around the fortress. In the 15th and 16th centuries, the village often changed its owners. The owners include lords of Moravany, lords of Kravaře, lords of Ojnice, lords of Zástřizly, the Zierotin family, and Václav Hagvic of Biskupice. Thanks to income from viticulture and fish farming, it prospered.

In 1586, Milotice was acquired by Bernard Ludwig Tovar of Enzesfeld. He had rebuilt the old water fortress into a Renaissance residence. Until 1648, Milotice changed owners very frequently, which led to a loss of its value. From 1648 to 1811, it was property of the Serényi noble family, then it was managed by female descendants of the house. In 1670, the corner towers and additional floor were added to the castle. From 1888 until 1945, the castle was owned by the Seilern-Aspang family. In 1945, the castle was confiscated from them by the state.

Sights
The current appearance of the Milotice Castle is from the first half of the 18th century, when baroque reconstructions were made. Today Milotice Castle is one of the main tourist destinations in the region. The castle includes a French formal garden, which was partly changed to an English park in the early 19th century.

References

External links

Milotice Castle

Villages in Hodonín District